Cosmas Silei (born 10 September 1948) is a Kenyan former middle distance runner who competed in the 1972 Summer Olympics.

References

1948 births
Living people
Kenyan male middle-distance runners
Commonwealth Games competitors for Kenya
Athletes (track and field) at the 1974 British Commonwealth Games
Olympic athletes of Kenya
Athletes (track and field) at the 1972 Summer Olympics
African Games gold medalists for Kenya
African Games medalists in athletics (track and field)
Athletes (track and field) at the 1973 All-Africa Games